The  is a geographical area that is located in the Rokkō Mountains, Hyōgo, Japan. This valley is a part of Setonaikai National Park in Japan. The name of Hōrai Valley coming from a name of the mountain in a mystical land found in Chinese mythology.

Outline
Horai Valley is a typical ‘Badland' along Ōtada River in the Rokkō Mountains. It is said that there is no so many typical bad land as Hōrai Valley. The valley is made from granite and the stones are soft enough to be broken by hands of climbers. Many climbers and tourists are attracted by the unique sights just not far from down town of Osaka or Kobe.

Hōrai Valley is made of two parts. The lower part, Hōrai Valley for the narrow part, and the upper part, Oku-Horai Valley, or Deep Hōrai Valley.

Access
Shirube Iwa Bus stop or Zatodani Bus stop of Hankyu Bus.

Gallery

See also
 Kamakura Valley

References
Official Home Page of the Geographical Survey Institute in Japan 
Rokkosan, Yama to Keikosha, 2007

Tourist attractions in Hyōgo Prefecture
Landforms of Hyōgo Prefecture
Valleys of Japan